Wheatland station of the Union Pacific, Denver and Gulf Railway in Wheatland, Wyoming was built in 1895.  It was a work of Charlie Goodrich.  It was listed on the National Register of Historic Places in 1996 as the Wheatland Railroad Depot.

References

Railway stations on the National Register of Historic Places in Wyoming
Railway stations in the United States opened in 1895
National Register of Historic Places in Platte County, Wyoming
Former National Register of Historic Places in Wyoming
Former Chicago, Burlington and Quincy Railroad stations
Colorado and Southern Railway
Former railway stations in Wyoming